Heaven is a power ballad  by American glam metal band Warrant. It was released in July 1989, as the second single from Warrant's debut album Dirty Rotten Filthy Stinking Rich. The song is Warrant's most commercially successful single, spending two weeks at number two on the Billboard Hot 100, and number three on the Mainstream Rock Tracks chart. 
The track's commercial success has led it to becoming one of the best known songs by the band.

Background
"Heaven" took Warrant's record company by surprise. Indeed, once the widespread appeal of the song became apparent, the band was instructed to re-record the track to lend it a "bigger radio sound". The first 250,000 copies of the record featured the original version while later pressings featured a new version. The song had previously been recorded by Jani Lane and Steven Sweet's old band Plain Jane.

Music video
The music video starred Scottish model Tracy Allan. It was filmed during a live concert at Sandstone Amphitheater in Kansas City, Kansas and at other locations around the Kansas City Metro area as well as New York City.

Alternate versions
"Heaven" was re-visited by the band in 1999 on their Greatest & Latest album and was released as promo and later iTunes singles. The song was also released on several mixed compilation albums. In 2004, Jani Lane re-recorded an acoustic version of "Heaven" which appeared on the "VH1 Classic Metal Mania: Stripped" compilations.

Chart positions

Weekly charts

Year-end charts

Certifications

References

1988 songs
1989 singles
1995 singles
Glam metal ballads
Song recordings produced by Beau Hill
Songs written by Jani Lane
Warrant (American band) songs
Columbia Records singles
1980s ballads